This is a list of Archbishops of Cyprus since its foundation with known dates of enthronement. According to tradition, the Church of Cyprus was created by St. Barnabas in 45 AD. The see of Cyprus was declared autocephalous by the Council of Ephesus, on 30 July 431; its autocephaly was abolished in 1260, and was restored in 1571. As the head of the Church of Cyprus, the holder is styled Archbishop of Nova Justiniana and All Cyprus.

Archbishops of Cyprus

First Autocephalous Period (45–1260)
Gelasios I (325)
St. Epiphanios I (368)
Stavrinos I (403)
Troilos (431)
Reginos (431)
Olympios I (449)
Stavrinos II (457)
Anthemios (470)
Olympios II (During the reign of Justinian)
Philoxenos (During the reign of Justinian)
Damianos (During the reign of Justinian)
Sophronios I (During the reign of Justinian)
Gregorios (During the reign of Justinian)
Arkadios (During the reign of Justinian)
Theophanes I
Plutarch (620)
Arkadios II (630)
Serghios (643)
Epiphanios II (681)
John I (691)
Georgios (750)
Constantine (783)
Akakios (after 787)
Gelasios II (after 787 and likely successor of Akakios)
Theophanes II (early 9th century and likely successor of Gelasios Ii)
John II (early 9th century and likely successor of Theophanes II and predecessor either of Barnabas or Epiphanios III)
Epiphanios III (890)
Vasilios
Nikolaos, later Ecumenical Patriarch of Constantinople
John III (1151)
Barnabas II (1175)
Sophronios II (1191)
Isaias (1209)
Neophytos I (1222)
Georgios II (1254)
Germanos I (1260)

Non-Autocephalous Period (1260–1571)
During the Lusignan and later Venetian rule from 1260–1571 the Church of Cyprus ceased to be autocephalous and came under the direct rule of the Papacy, its fourteen dioceses was reduced to four until after the Ottoman conquest in 1571, when the Ottomans, for expedient administrative reasons, restored to the Orthodox Church of Cyprus all its previous privileges and rights.

Second Autocephalous Period (1571–present)
Timotheos (1572)
Lavrentios (1580)
Neophytos II (1592)
Athanasios I (1592)
Veniamin (1600)
Christodoulos I (1606)
Nikephorus (1641)
Ilarion Kigalas (1674)
Christodoulos II (1682)
Iacovos I (1691)
Germanos II (1695)
Athanasios II (1705), later Patriarch of Antioch
Iacovos II (1709)
Silvestros (1718)
Philotheos (1734)
Paissios (1759)
Chrysanthos (1767)
Kyprianos (1810)
Ioakim (1821)
Damaskinos (1824)
Panaretos (1827)
Ioannikos (1840)
Kyrillos I (1849)
Makarios I (1854)
Sophronios III (1865)
Kyrillos II (1909)
Kyrillos III (1916)
Leontios (1947)
Makarios II (1947)
Makarios III (1950), first President of the Republic of Cyprus
Chrysostomos I (1977)
Chrysostomos II (2006)
George III (2022)

See also

Church of Cyprus
St. Barnabas
Council of Ephesus
Catholic Church in Cyprus

References

Sources
 

 
Archbishops   
Cyprus
Archbishops